Jin An (born 23 March 1996) is a Taiwanese-South Korean basketball player. She is part of the South Korean team in the women's tournament at the 2020 Summer Olympics.

References

1996 births
Living people
People from Yilan County, Taiwan
Basketball players at the 2020 Summer Olympics
Olympic basketball players of South Korea
South Korean women's basketball players
South Korean people of Taiwanese descent
Taiwanese women's basketball players
Taiwanese emigrants to South Korea